Erwin Blasl (born 27 December 1911, date of death unknown) was an Austrian water polo player. He competed in the men's tournament at the 1936 Summer Olympics.

References

External links

1911 births
Year of death missing
Austrian male water polo players
Olympic water polo players of Austria
Water polo players at the 1936 Summer Olympics
Place of birth missing